The Anscarids or the House of Ivrea were a medieval dynasty of Frankish origin which rose to prominence in Northern Italy in the tenth century, even briefly holding the Italian throne. The main branch ruled the County of Burgundy from the eleventh to fourteenth centuries and it was one of their members who first declared himself a count palatine. The cadet Castilian branch of Ivrea ruled the Kingdom of Galicia from 1111 and the Kingdoms of Castile and León from 1126 until 1369. The House of Trastámara, which ruled in Castile, Aragon, Naples, and Navarre at various points between the late 14th and early 16th centuries, was an illegitimate cadet branch of that family.

Ivrea
The founder of the family's fortunes was a petty Burgundian count named Anscar, who, with the support of his powerful brother, the archbishop of Rheims Fulk the Venerable, brought Guy III of Spoleto to Langres to be crowned King of France in 887. Their plot failing, Anscar accompanied Guy back to Italy to seek that vacant throne and, in gratefulness to Anscar, Guy created the March of Ivrea to bestow on his Burgundian faithful. Anscar's descendants held the march until 1030. Perhaps the most illustrious scion of the house was his grandson Berengar, the first of three Anscarids to be crowned king of Italy.

Berengar seized the throne in 950 after the death of Lothair II. He was opposed, immediately, by Lothair's widow Adelaide, whom he imprisoned after his attempt to force her marriage to his son, Adalbert II, failed. Emperor Otto I came down the peninsula and forced him to do homage in 952. For the next eleven years, Berengar and his co-crowned son governed Italy until Otto finally formally deposed them in 963.

From 1002 to 1014 Arduin of Italy held the Italian throne in opposition to the German Henry II.

Counts of Burgundy
Adalbert was eventually forced to flee to Burgundy, where he died at Autun. His widow remarried to Otto-Henry, Duke of Burgundy and her son by Adalbert, Otto William, was adopted by the duke. In 982, the County of Burgundy (which will later be known as Free County) is created. Otto-Henri supported Otto-William to be the first count of Burgundy. At the death of the duke, the count inherited the duchy of Burgundy. After the council of Héry (1015), Robert II of France and his son, Henry I of France, confiscated the duchy, leaving only a small portion around Dijon to Otto-William.

The greatest of the free counts was Renaud III, who, from 1127, used the title franc-comte as a sign of independence of German or Imperial authority, but was forced to submit to Conrad III. His daughter and heiress, Beatrice, married Frederick Barbarossa and united the Anscarid inheritance with that of the Hohenstaufen. Burgundy was inherited by her son Otto I, who had an Anscarid name. Thus the county was lost for the House of Ivrea, but it came back when Hugh of Chalon married to Adelaide countess of Burgundy, daughter of Beatrice II of Hohenstaufen (Otto I's daughter). However, in 1303 died Otto IV, Count of Burgundy, last male of the main line and the county inherited to the Dampierre family and finally to the Capetian-Valois dukes of Burgundy.

John I of Chalon-Arlay, a younger brother of Hugh of Chalon, became the founder of the line of Chalon-Arlay. His descendant, John III of Chalon-Arlay married Mary de Beaux princess of Orange, thus the principality was acquired by the family. The last male offspring was Philibert of Chalon who died in 1530. The possessions inherited to son of his sister Claudia of Chalon, i.e. René of Nassau.

Castilian branch of Ivrea
Raymond, fourth son of Count William I of Burgundy, travelled to Castile-León in the late eleventh century and there married Urraca, the future monarch. She was succeeded by their son, Alfonso VII. Subsequent monarchs of Castile and León were their agnatic descendants until the 16th century, although the crown had passed to an illegitimate cadet branch, the House of Trastámara, in the late 14th century.

Family tree of House of Ivrea

See also
House of Chalon-Arlay, the second ruling house of the Principality of Orange, also a cadet branch of the Anscarids. 
Portuguese House of Burgundy, a cadet branch of the House of Capet, which ruled Portugal contemporaneously with the Castilian House of Ivrea.

Sources
Wickham, Chris. Early Medieval Italy: Central Power and Local Society 400–1000. MacMillan Press: 1981.

|-

|-

 
History of Franche-Comté
Political history of Italy
Italy
Lists of Italian nobility
Kings of Italy
Monarchy in Italy